400 Lake Shore Drive is an approved project in the Streeterville neighborhood of Chicago, on the site of the previously proposed Chicago Spire development. It features two connected towers with a height of 875 feet (267 m) for the northern tower, and 765 feet (233 m) for the southern tower. 

Related Midwest is developing the project alongside the American architect and lead designer David Childs, of the architecture and urban planning firm Skidmore, Owings, and Merrill. The project had undergone a number of revisions before its approval in 2020.

Background

Original plans for the site included the Santiago Calatrava-designed Chicago Spire, which would have been the second tallest building in the world at completion had it been built as planned. The project, led by Garrett Kelleher of the Shelbourne Development Group, fell through as a result of financial difficulties during the Great Recession. In 2010, after many lawsuits against Kelleher and Shelbourne, courts handed control of the site to a receiver.

In 2013, Ireland's National Asset Management Agency (NAMA) put the site up for sale, and Shelbourne sought a court-approved reorganization plan to continue the Spire project; Related Midwest was one of the creditors of the plan, and purchased the debt associated with the property in June. In 2016, Shelbourne failed to make a required payment to Related Midwest, and after a lawsuit, Related was handed full control of the site. Related announced that they would not move forward with the Chicago Spire project.

Development 
In 2016, two years after the site was handed to Related Midwest, architectural firm Gensler released conceptual renderings for the site, and dubbed their proposal the "Gateway Tower". In December 2017, renders for the site by Zaha Hadid Architects were leaked, but Related Midwest denied these were the final designs for the site.

In May 2018, Related released their first official plans for the site. The designs called for a two-tower complex, with a 1,100-foot (335 m) tower and an 850-foot (259 m) tower, featuring bay windows and terracotta cladding, and connected at ground level by a podium housing two restaurants and a ballroom. The towers were to contain 300 condominium units, 175 hotel rooms, and 500 rental apartments. The designs also included the revitalization of the adjacent, undeveloped Dusable Park. 

In October 2018, the office of Alderman Brendan Reilly disclosed that he had rejected the plans released in May because of various concerns with the development's potential impact on the neighborhood. Reilly objected to the inclusion of hotel rooms and the scale of the podium connecting the two buildings. Without Reilly's approval, the project was unable to move forward.

In February 2019, the Plan Commission voted in favor of granting Related an extension of zoning rights, to accommodate for time needed to revise the project's design. In June 2020, the Chicago City Council approved an updated design for the development. Adjustments to the design included height reductions for the towers: the north tower was reduced to 875 feet (267 m), and the south tower to 765 feet (233 m). Proposals for condominiums and a hotel were also scrapped, and the scale of the podium was reduced. Related Midwest intends to begin construction of the development in 2022, with the project expected to conclude in 2024.

See also
 Chicago Spire
Dusable Park (Chicago)
Related Midwest
List of tallest buildings in Chicago

References

External links
 Skidmore, Owings, and Merrill page

Proposed buildings and structures in Illinois
Proposed skyscrapers in the United States
Skidmore, Owings & Merrill buildings
Residential skyscrapers in Chicago